Clerical fascism (also clero-fascism or clerico-fascism) is an ideology that combines the political and economic doctrines of fascism with clericalism. The term has been used to describe organizations and movements that combine religious elements with fascism, receive support from religious organizations which espouse sympathy for fascism, or fascist regimes in which clergy play a leading role.

History 
The term clerical fascism (clero-fascism or clerico-fascism) emerged in the early 1920s in the Kingdom of Italy, referring to the faction of the Roman Catholic Partito Popolare Italiano (PPI) which supported Benito Mussolini and his régime. It was supposedly coined by Don Luigi Sturzo, a priest and Christian democrat leader who opposed Mussolini and went into exile in 1924, although the term had also been used before Mussolini's March on Rome in 1922 to refer to Catholics in Northern Italy who advocated a synthesis of Roman Catholicism and fascism.

Sturzo made a distinction between the "filofascists", who left the Catholic PPI in 1921 and 1922, and the "clerical fascists" who stayed in the party after the March on Rome, advocating collaboration with the fascist government. Eventually, the latter group converged with Mussolini, abandoning the PPI in 1923 and creating the Centro Nazionale Italiano. The PPI was disbanded by the fascist régime in 1926.

The term has since been used by scholars seeking to contrast authoritarian-conservative clerical fascism with more radical variants. Christian fascists focus on internal religious politics, such as passing laws and regulations that reflect their view of Christianity. Radicalized forms of Christian fascism or clerical fascism (clero-fascism or clerico-fascism) were emerging on the far-right of the political spectrum in some European countries during the interwar period in the first half of the 20th century.

Fascist Italy 

In 1870, the newly formed Kingdom of Italy annexed the remaining Papal States, depriving the Pope of his temporal power. However, in the 1929 Lateran Treaty, Mussolini recognized the Pope as sovereign ruler of the Vatican City state, and  Roman Catholicism became the state religion of Fascist Italy.

In March 1929, a nationwide plebiscite was held to publicly endorse the Lateran Treaty. Opponents were intimidated by the fascist regime: the Catholic Action organisation (Azione Cattolica) and Mussolini claimed that "no" votes were of those "few ill-advised anti-clericals who refuse to accept the Lateran Pacts". Nearly nine million Italians voted, or 90 per cent of the registered electorate, and only 136,000 voted "no".

Almost immediately after the signing of the Treaty, relations between Mussolini and the Church soured again. Mussolini "referred to Catholicism as, in origin, a minor sect that had spread beyond Palestine only because grafted onto the organization of the Roman empire." After the concordat, "he confiscated more issues of Catholic newspapers in the next three months than in the previous seven years." Mussolini reportedly came close to being excommunicated from the Catholic Church around this time.

In 1938, the Italian Racial Laws and Manifesto of Race were promulgated by the fascist regime to persecute Italian Jews as well as Protestant Christians, especially Evangelicals and Pentecostals. Thousands of Italian Jews and a small number of Protestants died in the Nazi concentration camps. 
In January 1939, the Jewish National Monthly reports "the only bright spot in Italy has been the Vatican, where fine humanitarian statements by the Pope have been issuing regularly". Pope Pius XI personally admitted Professor Vito Volterra, a famous Italian Jewish mathematician expelled from his position by the regime, into the Pontifical Academy of Science.

Despite Mussolini's close alliance with Hitler's Germany, Italy did not fully adopt Nazism's genocidal ideology towards the Jews. The Nazis were frustrated by the Italian authorities' refusal to co-operate in the round-ups of Jews, and no Jews were deported prior to the formation of the Italian Social Republic following the Armistice of Cassibile. In the Italian-occupied Independent State of Croatia, German envoy Siegfried Kasche advised Berlin that Italian forces had "apparently been influenced" by Vatican opposition to German anti-Semitism. As anti-Axis feeling grew in Italy, the use of Vatican Radio to broadcast papal disapproval of race murder and anti-Semitism angered the Nazis. When Mussolini was overthrown in July 1943, the Germans moved to occupy Italy and commenced a round-up of Jews.

Around 4% of Resistance forces were formally Catholic organisations, but Catholics dominated other "independent groups" such as the Fiamme Verdi and Osoppo partisans, and there were also Catholic militants in the Garibaldi Brigades, such as Benigno Zaccagnini, who later served as a prominent Christian Democrat politician. In Northern Italy, tensions between Catholics and communists in the movement led Catholics to form the Fiamme Verdi as a separate brigade of Christian Democrats. After the war, the ideological divisions between former partisans re-emerged, becoming a hallmark of post-war Italian politics.

Examples of clerical fascism 

Examples of political movements involving certain elements of clerical fascism include:

 the Fatherland Front in Austria led by Austrian Catholic Chancellors Engelbert Dollfuss and Kurt Schuschnigg.
 the Rexist Party in Belgium led by Léon Degrelle, a Belgian Catholic.
 the Brazilian Integralist Action in Brazil led by Brazilian Catholic Plínio Salgado.
 the Ustaše movement led by Poglavnik and Prime Minister Ante Pavelić in the Independent State of Croatia and its support from the Croatian Catholic Church.
 the Lapua Movement and the Patriotic People's Movement (IKL) in Finland led by the Lutherans (körtti) Vihtori Kosola and Vilho Annala respectively. Pastor Elias Simojoki led the IKL's youth organization the Blue-and-Blacks.
 the German Christians of the Nazi Party in Nazi Germany led by Ludwig Müller which attempted to unify German Protestants during the Kirchenkampf but failed.
 Metaxism and the 4th of August Regime in Greece which was led by Ioannis Metaxas and heavily supported the Greek Orthodox Church.
 National Synarchist Union in Mexico led by Mexican Catholic José Antonio Urquiza before his assassination in 1938, it was a revival of the Catholic reaction that drove the Cristero War; midcentury the movement would become the center of a conspiracy theory alleging its infiltration of various institutions under the name El Yunque. 
 the National Radical Camp in Poland led by Boleslaw Piasecki, Henryk Rossman, Tadeusz Gluzinski and Jan Mosdorf which heavily incorporated Polish Catholicism into its ideology especially the Falangist faction.
 the National Union in Portugal led by Prime Ministers António de Oliveira Salazar and Marcelo Caetano. 
 the National-Christian Defense League/Iron Guard of Romania, which was led by the devoutly Romanian Orthodox Corneliu Zelea Codreanu.
 the Serbian Action, an ultranationalist and clerical fascist movement, active in Serbia since 2010.
 the Slovak People's Party (Ľudaks) in Slovakia led by President Jozef Tiso, a Catholic priest.
 the FET y de las JONS of Spain led by Spanish Catholic Francisco Franco, which developed into National Catholicism.
 the Silver Legion of America in the United States led by William Dudley Pelley which combined American Christianity (specifically Protestantism) with American white nationalism.
The National Union in Portugal led by Prime Ministers António de Oliveira Salazar and Marcelo Caetano is not considered Fascist by historians such as Stanley G. Payne, Thomas Gerard Gallagher, Juan José Linz, António Costa Pinto, Roger Griffin, Robert Paxton and Howard J. Wiarda, though it is considered Fascist by historians such as Manuel de Lucena, Jorge Pais de Sousa, Manuel Loff, and Hermínio Martins. One of Salazar's actions was to ban the National Syndicalists/Fascists. Salazar distanced himself from fascism and Nazism, which he criticized as a "pagan Caesarism" that recognised neither legal nor moral limits.

Likewise, the Fatherland Front in Austria led by Austrian Catholic Chancellors Engelbert Dollfuss and Kurt Schuschnigg is often not regarded as a fully fascist party. It has been called semi-Fascist and even imitation Fascist. Dollfuss was murdered by the Nazis, shot in his office by the SS and left to bleed to death. His regime did initially receive support from Fascist Italy, which formed the Stresa Front with the United Kingdom and France.

Nonetheless, scholars who accept the use of the term clerical fascism debate which of the listed examples should be dubbed "clerical fascist", with the Ustaše being the most widely included. In the examples cited above, the degree of official Catholic support and clerical influence over lawmaking and government varies. Moreover, several authors reject the concept of a clerical fascist régime, arguing that an entire fascist régime does not become "clerical" if elements of the clergy support it, while others are not prepared to use the term "clerical fascism" outside the context of what they call the fascist epoch, between the ends of the two world wars (1918–1945).

Some scholars consider certain contemporary movements to be forms of clerical fascism, such as Christian Identity and Christian Reconstructionism in the United States; "the most virulent form" of Islamic fundamentalism, Islamism; and militant Hindu nationalism in India.

The political theorist Roger Griffin warns against the "hyperinflation of clerical fascism". According to Griffin, the use of the term "clerical fascism" should be limited to "the peculiar forms of politics that arise when religious clerics and professional theologians are drawn either into collusion with the secular ideology of fascism (an occurrence particularly common in interwar Europe); or, more rarely, manage to mix a theologically illicit cocktail of deeply held religious beliefs with a fascist commitment to saving the nation or race from decadence or collapse". Griffin adds that "clerical fascism" "should never be used to characterize a political movement or a regime in its entirety, since it can at most be a faction within fascism", while he defines fascism as "a revolutionary, secular variant of ultranationalism bent on the total rebirth of society through human agency".

In the case of the Slovak State, some scholars have rejected the use of the term clerical fascism as a label for the regime and they have particularly rejected its use as a label for Jozef Tiso.

See also 
 Alois Hudal
 Catholic Church and Nazi Germany
 Christian Nationalism
 Christofascism
 Criticism of Zionism
 Hindutva
 Islamofascism
 Kahanism
 National Union (Italy, 1923)
 Positive Christianity
 Religious nationalism
 Ratlines (World War II aftermath)

References

Bibliography 

 Walter K. Andersen. "Bharatiya Janata Party: Searching for the Hindu Nationalist Face", in The New Politics of the Right: Neo-Populist Parties and Movements in Established Democracies, ed. Hans-Georg Betz and Stefan Immerfall (New York: St. Martin's Press, 1998), pp. 219–232. ; .
 Stefan Arvidsson. Aryan Idols: The Indo-European Mythology as Ideology and Science. (University of Chicago Press, 2006) .
 Partha Banerjee, In the Belly of the Beast: The Hindu Supremacist RSS and BJP of India (Delhi: Ajanta, 1998). 
 
 
 
 Charles Bloomberg and Saul Dubow, eds., Christian-Nationalism and the Rise of the Afrikaner Broederbond in South Africa, 1918–48 (Bloomington: Indiana University Press, 1989). 
 Randolph L. Braham and Scott Miller, The Nazis Last Victims: The Holocaust in Hungary (Detroit: Wayne State University Press, [1998] 2002). 
 
 
 
 Ainslie T. Embree, "The Function of the Rashtriya Swayamsevak Sangh: To Define the Hindu Nation", in Accounting for Fundamentalisms, The Fundamentalism Project. 4th ed. Martin E. Marty and R. Scott Appleby (Chicago: The University of Chicago Press, 1994), pp. 617–652. .
 
 
 
 
 
 
 Mark Juergensmeyer. The New Cold War?: Religious Nationalism Confronts the Secular State. Berkeley: University of California Press, 1993. .
 
 
 Laqueur, Walter (1966). Fascism: Past, Present, Future. New York; Oxford: Oxford University Press, 1997. 
 Nicholas M. Nagy-Talavera, The Green Shirts and the Others: A History of Fascism in Hungary and Romania. Iaşi and Oxford: The Center for Romanian Studies, 2001. .
 
 
 
 
 Walid Phares, Lebanese Christian Nationalism: The Rise and Fall of an Ethnic Resistance (Boulder, Col.: L. Rienner, 1995). 
 
 
 
 
 
 
 
 Livia Rothkirchen, "Vatican Policy and the 'Jewish Problem' in Independent Slovakia (1939–1945)" in Michael R. Marrus (ed.), The Nazi Holocaust 3, (Wesport: Meckler, 1989), pp. 1306–1332.  or 
 
 
 Leon Volovici, Nationalist Ideology and Antisemitism: The Case of Romanian Intellectuals in the 1930s (Oxford: Pergamon Press, 1991). 
 
 Various authors, ‘Clerical Fascism’ in Interwar Europe, special issue of Totalitarian Movements and Political Religions, Volume 8, Issue 2, 2007.

 
Fascism
Political ideologies
Religion and politics